The Bust of Antonio Barberini is a portrait sculpture by the Italian artist Gian Lorenzo Bernini. The figure is Cardinal Antonio Barberini, the younger brother of the Pope Urban VIII. It was executed some time in the 1620s.

Rome
The bust is now in the Galleria Nazionale de Arte Antica, in Rome, Italy

References
Notes

Bibliography

 Wittkower, Rudolf. Bernini: The Sculptor of the Roman Baroque. London: Phaidon Press, 1997.

Busts by Gian Lorenzo Bernini
1620s sculptures
Marble sculptures in Italy
Busts in Italy